EURIWARE was a French company that provided advanced Consultancy and IT services in the spheres of energy, industry and defense.

The core business of EURIWARE included consultancy, systems integration (enterprise systems, industrial and technical systems) and outsourcing.
EURIWARE was fully owned by AREVA group, a French energy corporation mainly known as a nuclear power provider.

The company had 13 locations in France and 2 locations abroad:
in the USA, through former AREVA Federal Services
in Russia, through its subsidiary OPEN CASCADE which became a direct subsidiary of Capgemini since the merger of EURIWARE with Capgemini in 2015.

Company core activities 
 Consulting (through its former subsidiary PEA Consulting)
 Systems Integration
 Outsourcing (through its former subsidiary OPEN CASCADE)

On May 7, 2014, EURIWARE was acquired by Capgemini

On June 17, 2015, EURIWARE was merged with its mother company, Capgemini

References

External links
EURIWARE website

Companies based in Paris-Saclay
Information technology consulting firms of France
Information technology companies of France